In mathematics, random groups are certain groups obtained by a probabilistic construction. They were introduced by Misha Gromov to answer questions such as "What does a typical group look like?"

It so happens that, once a precise definition is given, random groups satisfy some properties with very high probability, whereas other properties fail with very high probability. For instance, very probably random groups are hyperbolic groups. In this sense, one can say that "most groups are hyperbolic".

Definition

The definition of random groups depends on a probabilistic model on the set of possible groups. Various such probabilistic models yield different (but related) notions of random groups.

Any group can be defined by a group presentation involving generators and relations. The main idea of random groups is to start with a fixed number of group generators , and imposing relations of the form  where each  is a random word involving the letters  and their formal inverses .

Once the random relations  have been chosen, the resulting random group  is defined in the standard way for group presentations, namely:  is the quotient of the free group  with generators , by the normal subgroup  generated by the relations  seen as elements of :

The few-relator model of random groups

The simplest model of random groups is the few-relator model. In this model, a number of generators  and a number of relations  are fixed. Fix an additional parameter  (the length of the relations), which is typically taken very large.

Then, the model consists in choosing the relations  at random, uniformly and independently among all possible reduced words of length at most  involving the letters  and their formal inverses .

Further remarks

More refined models of random groups have been defined.

For instance, in the density model, the number of relations is allowed to grow with the length of the relations. Then there is a sharp "phase transition" phenomenon: if the number of relations is larger than some threshold, the random group "collapses" (because the relations allow to show that any word is equal to any other), whereas below the threshold the resulting random group is infinite and hyperbolic.

Constructions of random groups can also be twisted in specific ways to build group with particular properties. For instance, Gromov used this technique to build new groups that are counter-examples to an extension of the Baum–Connes conjecture.

References 

 Mikhail Gromov. Hyperbolic groups. Essays in group theory, 75–263, Math. Sci. Res. Inst. Publ., 8, Springer, New York, 1987.
 Mikhail Gromov. "Random walk in random groups." Geom. Funct. Anal., vol. 13 (2003), 73–146.

Geometric group theory
Properties of groups
Combinatorics on words